Men Sam An (born 15 August 1953) is a Cambodian politician. She belongs to the Cambodian People's Party and was elected to represent Svay Rieng Province in the National Assembly in 2003.

As of 2009, she serves as permanent Deputy Prime Minister of Cambodia. She is the first female deputy prime minister and four-star general. She joined the army in 1970 during the US-backed Khmer Republic era, beginning her career as military nurse.

References

1953 births
Members of the National Assembly (Cambodia)
Living people
Deputy Prime Ministers of Cambodia
Cambodian military personnel
Cambodian generals
Cambodian People's Party politicians
Government ministers of Cambodia
People from Kratié province
Women government ministers of Cambodia
21st-century Cambodian women politicians
21st-century Cambodian politicians